The following highways are numbered 955:

Canada

United States